In mathematical logic, Löb's theorem states that in Peano arithmetic (PA) (or any formal system including PA), for any formula P, if it is provable in PA that "if P is provable in PA then P is true", then P is provable in PA. If Prov(P) means that the formula P is provable, we may express this more formally as

If 

then 

An immediate corollary (the contrapositive) of Löb's theorem is that, if P is not provable in PA, then "if P is provable in PA, then P is true" is not provable in PA. For example, "If  is provable in PA, then " is not provable in PA.

Löb's theorem is named for Martin Hugo Löb, who formulated it in 1955. It is related to 
Curry's paradox.

Löb's theorem in provability logic

Then we can formalize Löb's theorem by the axiom

known as axiom GL, for Gödel–Löb. This is sometimes formalized by means of an inference rule that infers

from

The provability logic GL that results from taking the modal logic K4 (or K, since the axiom schema 4, then becomes redundant) and adding the above axiom GL is the most intensely investigated system in provability logic.

Modal proof of Löb's theorem
Löb's theorem can be proved within modal logic using only some basic rules about the provability operator (the K4 system) plus the existence of modal fixed points.

Modal formulas
We will assume the following grammar for formulas:
 If  is a propositional variable, then  is a formula.
 If  is a propositional constant, then  is a formula.
 If  is a formula, then  is a formula.

A modal sentence is a modal formula that contains no propositional variables. We use  to mean  is a theorem.

Modal fixed points

We will assume the existence of such fixed points for every modal formula with one free variable. This is of course not an obvious thing to assume, but if we interpret  as provability in Peano Arithmetic, then the existence of modal fixed points follows from the diagonal lemma.

Modal rules of inference
In addition to the existence of modal fixed points, we assume the following rules of inference for the provability operator , known as Hilbert–Bernays provability conditions:

 (necessitation) From  conclude : Informally, this says that if A is a theorem, then it is provable.
 (internal necessitation) : If A is provable, then it is provable that it is provable.
 (box distributivity) :  This rule allows you to do modus ponens inside the provability operator. If it is provable that A implies B, and A is provable, then B is provable.

Proof of Löb's theorem

Much of the proof does not make use of the assumption , so for ease of understanding, the proof below is subdivided to leave the parts depending on  until the end.  

Let  be any modal sentence.

 From the existence of modal fixed points for every formula (in particular, the formula ) it follows there exists a sentence  such that .
 , from 1.
 , from 2 by the necessitation rule.
 , from 3 and the box distributivity rule.
 , from 4 and 5.
 , from 6 by the internal necessitation rule.
 , from 6 and 7.Now comes the part of the proof where the hypothesis is used.
 Assume that .  Roughly speaking, it is a theorem that if  is provable, then it is, in fact true.  This is a claim of soundness.
 , from 8 and 9.
 , from 1.
 , from 10 and 11.
 , from 12 by the necessitation rule.
 , from 13 and 10.

Examples
An immediate corollary of Löb's theorem is that, if P is not provable in PA, then "if P is provable in PA, then P is true" is not provable in PA. Given we know PA is consistent (but PA does not know PA is consistent), here are some simple examples:
 "If  is provable in PA, then " is provable in PA, as is any statement of the form "If X, then ".
 "If the strengthened finite Ramsey theorem is provable in PA, then the strengthened finite Ramsey theorem is true" is not provable in PA, as "The strengthened finite Ramsey theorem is true" is not provable in PA (despite being true).

In Doxastic logic, Löb's theorem shows that any system classified as a reflexive "type 4" reasoner must also be "modest": such a reasoner can never believe "my belief in P would imply that P is true", without also believing that P is true.

Gödel's second incompleteness theorem follows from Löb's theorem by substituting the false statement  for P.

Converse: Löb's theorem implies the existence of modal fixed points
Not only does the existence of modal fixed points imply Löb's theorem, but the converse is valid, too.  When Löb's theorem is given as an axiom (schema), the existence of a fixed point (up to provable equivalence)  for any formula A(p) modalized in p can be derived.  Thus in normal modal logic, Löb's axiom is equivalent to the conjunction of the axiom schema 4, and the existence of modal fixed points.

Notes

Citations

References

External links
 Löb's theorem at PlanetMath
The Cartoon Guide to Löb’s Theorem by Eliezer Yudkowsky

Mathematical logic
Modal logic
Theorems in the foundations of mathematics
Metatheorems
Provability logic
Mathematical axioms